Biplob is a Bangladeshi singer-songwriter, guitarist, composer and a playback singer. He is the lead singer and guitarist of the rock band "Prometheus". He is regarded as one of the celebrated vocalists of Bangladesh in 1990s.

Personal life
Biplob was born in Dhaka and spent most of his early years in Mohammadpur area. His father Abu Taher was a Professor of Govt. Music College, Dhaka. Biplob is married to Aileen. The couple has a daughter and a son.

References

Year of birth missing (living people)
People from Dhaka
20th-century Bangladeshi male singers
20th-century Bangladeshi singers
Bangladeshi male musicians
Bangladeshi guitarists
Living people